The International Crimes Tribunal (ICT) is an ongoing tribunal in Bangladesh that aims to investigate and administer justice regarding the war crimes, crimes against humanity, genocide and crimes against peace committed by Pakistan army and their local collaborators Razakar, Al-Badr, Al-Shams during the Bangladesh Liberation War of 1971. In 2008's public election, one of the principal electoral manifesto of the Awami League was to initiate the trial process of war criminals. As promised, a member of parliament from Awami League submitted the proposal of the trial of war criminals on 29 January 2009 in National Parliament and the proposal was accepted unanimously. Finally after 39 years of Liberation of Bangladesh, on 25 March, the tribunal, attorney panel and investigation organization was formed for the trial of the ones accused of war crimes.

The timeline of this tribunal has been enumerated in this article.

2009

January

March

May

July

2010

March

July

August

September

October

November

December

2011

January

February

March

October

2012

March

April

References

External links
 International Crimes (Tribunals) Law 1973 from official website of Supreme Court.
 The Code of Criminal Procedure, 1898 (ACT NO. V OF 1898)
 Opinion of the Law Commission on the technical aspects of the International Crimes (Tribunals) Act, 1973 (Act No. XIX of 1973

Aftermath of the Bangladesh Liberation War
War crimes trials